The Fox-Wisconsin Portage Site is located in Portage, Wisconsin.

History
The site is a two-mile crossing from the upper Fox river to the Wisconsin and Mississippi, used by Native Americans, French fur traders, Marquette and Jolliet, and British soldiers, before there were roads or railroads through Wisconsin. It was added to the National Register of Historic Places in 1973.

References

Archaeological sites on the National Register of Historic Places in Wisconsin
Natural features on the National Register of Historic Places in Wisconsin
National Register of Historic Places in Columbia County, Wisconsin
Landforms of Columbia County, Wisconsin
Protected areas of Columbia County, Wisconsin